Cophixalus riparius is a species of frog in the family Microhylidae. It is endemic to Papua New Guinea and occurs in the New Guinea Highlands in Madang, Southern Highlands, and Western Highlands provinces southeastward to the Morobe Province. The specific name riparius refers to the creek-side habitat from which many specimens in the type series were collected. Common name Wilhelm rainforest frog has been coined for this species.

Names
It is known as gwnm in the Kalam language of Papua New Guinea, a name that is also applied to Xenorhina rostrata.

Description
The snout is short and bluntly rounded. The tympanum is only barely visible at its lower edge. The supratympanic fold is weak. The fingers and toes bear well-developed discs. Preserved specimens are dorsally purplish brown, with an irregular pattern of dark markings. These markings may sometimes form rugged dorsolateral lines or join to form a network, but only rarely reducing the lighter background to isolated spots.

Habitat and conservation
Development is direct (i.e., there is no free-living larval stage).

This species is common and adaptable, probably able to withstand a degree of habitat degradation. It is not facing significant threats. It might be present in the Mount Kaindi Wildlife Management Area.

References

riparius
Endemic fauna of New Guinea
Endemic fauna of Papua New Guinea
Amphibians of Papua New Guinea
Amphibians described in 1962
Taxa named by Richard G. Zweifel
Taxonomy articles created by Polbot